Sam A. Kozer (October 19, 1871 – October 12, 1935) was an American politician who served as Oregon's Secretary of State from 1920 to 1928. He was a member of the Republican Party. Kozer also served as the Oregon's first Insurance Commissioner (1909–1911), Deputy Secretary of State (1911–1920), and Budget Director (1928–1931).

Early life
Sam A. Kozer was born in Steelton, Pennsylvania, to George M. and Cathrine Kozer. He graduated high school in 1888. For money, Kozer would sell local news papers and do odd jobs. He remained in Pennsylvania through his late teen years working of the Pennsylvania Steel Company. After 18 months with the company, he was promoted to the chemical laboratory.

At the age of 19, Kozer moved to Oregon where he proceeded to work odd jobs. His first two jobs were working on a farm and in a hotel in Gearhart, Oregon. On February 1, 1890, Kozer was hired as clerk in the Clatsop County recorder's office. Over the next eight years, Kozer worked at multiple other offices in Clatsop County. In 1896, Kozer married Nannie Belcher of Astoria, Oregon. In 1898, Frank Dunbar, Kozer's boss in the recorder's office, was elected as Secretary of State of Oregon. Kozer was named chief clerk of Dunbar's office.

Political career
In 1909, Kozer was appointed to the position of Insurance Commissioner by Governor Frank W. Benson, making him the first person in Oregon to hold that office. Kozer's salary was US$3,000 a year. He was named the Oregon's first Deputy Secretary of State in 1911. He served under Ben W. Olcott in that position.

On May 28, 1920, Kozer was appointed to the position of Secretary of State. He resigned that position on September 24, 1928.

Later life
After his resignation from the office of Secretary of State, Kozer was named Oregon's Budget Director. Kozer was the head of the auditing department of the state board of higher education. He died on October 12, 1935, in Portland, Oregon.

References

1871 births
1935 deaths
Secretaries of State of Oregon
People from Dauphin County, Pennsylvania
People from Clatsop County, Oregon
Oregon Republicans
State insurance commissioners of the United States